Red Hood: The Lost Days is a six-issue comic book limited series published by DC Comics in 2010 which depicts the resurrection of the character Jason Todd, later known as Red Hood. The series was written by Judd Winick and illustrated by Pablo Raimundi.

Publication history
Winick had previously brought back the character Jason Todd from the dead in the series Batman: Under the Hood. The new limited series was meant to explain the missing years from Todd's life that had been left.

Plot
Jason Todd is reawakened from death, as he is taken care of by Talia al Ghul he plans to take revenge on those who hurt him in life.

Reception
The series holds an average rating of 7.8 by 13 professional critics on review aggregation website Comic Book Roundup.

Prints

Issues

Collected editions

See also
 List of DC Comics publications
 List of Batman comics

References

Red Hood titles
DC Comics limited series
2010 comics debuts
2010 comics endings